Brotherhood Raceway Park (sometimes referred to as Terminal Island Raceway) was a drag racing venue on Terminal Island which is between the neighborhood of San Pedro in the city of Los Angeles and the city of Long Beach.

Background
In 1974, "Big Willie" Robinson and his wife Tomiko, opened the drag strip which hosted  mile drag racing.  It opened on an old Navy airfield paying $1,000 per month to lease the facility.  Over the next two decades, the track would lose and regain the temporary lease several times but would permanently close in 1995, displaced by a coal-handling plant.

Today
Subsequent attempts to revive racing on the Terminal Island site, particularly when the coal facility closed, have not been successful.

Film and television
The drag strip was featured in a 1995 episode of Visiting with Huell Howser.

References

Motorsport venues in California
Defunct motorsport venues in the United States
Defunct sports venues in California
Defunct drag racing venues
1974 establishments in California
1995 disestablishments in California